Satish Chandra Agarwal (born Satish Gupta; 27 September 1928 – 10 September 1997) was the leader of the Bharatiya Janata Party and a member of the Sixth and Seventh Lok Sabha representing the Jaipur Parliamentary Constituency of Rajasthan, India from 1977–84. He was previously a member of the Rajasthan Legislative Assembly from 1957–72, and was later elected to the Rajya Sabha.

He was arrested and jailed during Indira Gandhi's Emergency for 19 months from 1975-76. 
An active social and political worker, and an eminent parliamentarian, Agarwal served as Union Minister of State for Finance for the Government of India from 1977–79.  He was a Member of Public Accounts Committee in 1980-81 and later served as its chairman from 1981–83.

Satish Agarwal was a member of the Indian Delegation to the Commonwealth Parliamentary Association Conference at Kuala Lumpur, Malaysia in 1971 and to the Colombo Plan Conference held in Kathmandu 1977, Washington, 1978 and London, 1979. He was a member of the Indian Delegation to Geneva in1984  and also participated in various other international conferences.

Agarwal died from a heart attack on 10 September, 1997 in Jaipur, Rajasthan at the age of 68.

References

1927 births
1997 deaths
Janata Party politicians
Bharatiya Janata Party politicians from Rajasthan
Politicians from Jaipur
India MPs 1977–1979
India MPs 1980–1984
Lok Sabha members from Rajasthan
Indians imprisoned during the Emergency (India)
Rajasthan MLAs 1957–1962
Rajya Sabha members from Rajasthan
Rajya Sabha members from the Bharatiya Janata Party